The Cincinnati Volksfreund was a daily and weekly German-language newspaper that was based in Cincinnati, Ohio, and published between 1850 and 1908 with offices located on the southwest corner of Vine and Longworth Streets.

The paper was founded in October 1850 by Joseph A. Hemann and his editorials began appearing in March 1853 in the weekly edition, the Cincinnati Wöchentlicher Volksfreund. Originally neutral in politics, the newspaper later became the leading German Democratic newspaper of Ohio.

Editors and owners 
 1850–1863 Joseph Anton Hemann, founder, publisher, editor
 1863–1869 Johann B. Jeup & Co.
 1870–1871 Volksfreund Publishing Co.
 1872–1873 Limberg & Thilly
 1873–1879 Limberg & Heinrich Haacke
 1880–1908 Heinrich Haacke and Co.

See also

 Der Wahrheitsfreund
 Hochwächter

References

Defunct daily newspapers
Defunct weekly newspapers
Defunct newspapers published in Cincinnati
Publications disestablished in 1908
Publications established in 1850
German-American culture in Cincinnati
Daily newspapers published in the United States
1908 disestablishments in Ohio
1850 establishments in Ohio
German-language newspapers published in Ohio